The Military ranks of Saudi Arabia are the military insignia used by the Armed Forces of Saudi Arabia. The ranks are influenced by both the United Kingdom and later the United States, due to the close relations during the development phase of the Saudi military.

Commissioned officer ranks 
The rank insignia of commissioned officers.

Other ranks 
The rank insignia of non-commissioned officers and enlisted personnel.

References

External links 

 

Saudi Arabia
Military of Saudi Arabia
Saudi Arabia